Jennifer Egan-Simmons (born 22 March 1987) is an Irish sprint canoeist.

She participated at the 2018 ICF Canoe Sprint World Championships, winning a medal.

References

External links

Living people
1987 births
Irish female canoeists
ICF Canoe Sprint World Championships medalists in kayak
European Games competitors for Ireland
Canoeists at the 2015 European Games
Canoeists at the 2019 European Games